Mistawasis 103E is an Indian reserve of the Mistawasis Nêhiyawak in Saskatchewan. It is 4 kilometres from Leask.

References

Indian reserves in Saskatchewan
Division No. 16, Saskatchewan